Brian Norman Skrudland (born July 31, 1963) is a Canadian former professional ice hockey player who played for the Montreal Canadiens, Calgary Flames, Florida Panthers, New York Rangers and Dallas Stars.

Playing career

Junior
Skrudland played for the Saskatoon Blades of the Western Hockey League from 1980 to 1983. His #10 jersey has been retired by the Blades since 2003.

Professional
Skrudland won the Jack A. Butterfield Trophy as the Most Valuable Player in the 1985 AHL Playoffs. Skrudland scored 17 points in 17 games leading the Sherbrooke Canadiens to a Calder Cup championship. Sherbrooke defeated the Baltimore Skipjacks 4 games to 2 in the final.

Skrudland made his NHL debut in 1985 for the Montreal Canadiens. He played 7.5 seasons with the Habs, winning the Stanley Cup in 1986. In game two of that series, Skrudland put his name in the NHL record books, when he scored the fastest overtime goal in Stanley Cup finals history at nine seconds. He was selected to go to the 1991 NHL All-Star Game, but could not attend due to injury. Skrudland was traded to the Calgary Flames during the 1992–1993 season. He moved to the expansion Florida Panthers for the 1993–1994 season and was the first captain in franchise history, a title he held for four seasons. Skrudland was with the team until 1997, including Florida's run to the 1996 Stanley Cup Finals, where they lost 4–0 to the Colorado Avalanche. He signed with the New York Rangers in the summer of 1997 and played one season with them until he was dealt along with Mike Keane to the Dallas Stars in exchange for Todd Harvey and Bob Errey. Skrudland was instrumental in helping the Stars win the Stanley Cup in 1999. Skrudland retired after the 2000 Stanley Cup finals (which Dallas lost to the New Jersey Devils), at 36 years old.

Skrudland was one of the final cuts for Team Canada during the 1991 Canada Cup tournament.

Skrudland was a finalist for the Selke Trophy in 1994.  The Frank J Selke Trophy is awarded annually to the best defensive minded forward in the NHL.

Skrudland holds the NHL record for fastest goal in a playoff overtime when he scored the winning goal at 0:09 seconds into overtime in Game 2 in the 1986 finals.

Personal life
Skrudland lives in Calgary, Alberta, with his wife Lana, and their three children. From July 6, 2010 until July 9, 2015, he was the director of player development for the Florida Panthers. Skrudland also served as assistant coach for the Panthers during the 2013–14 season.

Career statistics

Awards and honours

References

External links

1963 births
Living people
Calgary Flames coaches
Calgary Flames players
Canadian ice hockey centres
Canadian people of Norwegian descent
Dallas Stars players
Florida Panthers coaches
Florida Panthers players
Ice hockey people from Alberta
Montreal Canadiens players
National Hockey League All-Stars
New York Rangers players
Nova Scotia Voyageurs players
People from Northern Sunrise County
Saskatoon Blades players
Sherbrooke Canadiens players
Stanley Cup champions
Undrafted National Hockey League players
Canadian ice hockey coaches